551–555 North Goodman Street is a historic commercial building located in Rochester, Monroe County, New York.

Description and history 
The building is a large, four bay wide, three-story masonry building, designed in the Queen Anne style built in 1889.

It was listed on the National Register of Historic Places on March 20, 1986.

References

Commercial buildings in Rochester, New York
Commercial buildings on the National Register of Historic Places in New York (state)
Queen Anne architecture in New York (state)
Commercial buildings completed in 1889
National Register of Historic Places in Rochester, New York